The Women's 2022 Allam British Open was the women's edition of the 2022 British Open Squash Championships, which is a 2021–22 PSA World Tour event. The event took place at the Sports Complex at the University of Hull in Hull in England between 28 March and 3 April 2022. The event was sponsored by Dr Assem Allam.

Hania El Hammamy defeated Nouran Gohar in an all Egyptian final.

Seeds

Draw and results

Semi-finals and final

Main Draw

Top half

Bottom half

See also
2022 Men's British Open Squash Championship

References

Women's British Open
Women's British Open
British Open Squash
British Open Squash
Women's British Open Squash Championships
Women's sport in the United Kingdom
Sport in Kingston upon Hull
Squash in England
2020s in Kingston upon Hull